Christopher Leigh Williams is an American medical physicist and NASA astronaut candidate. He resides in Boston, Massachusetts.

Background
Williams grew up in Potomac, Maryland. He graduated Montgomery Blair High School, Silver Spring, Maryland in 2001. He graduated from Stanford University in 2005 with a bachelor’s degree in physics and a doctorate in physics from MIT in 2012, where his research was in astrophysics. Williams is a board-certified medical physicist,
completing his residency training at Harvard Medical School before joining the faculty as a clinical physicist and researcher.<ref
name="nasa_20211206_bio"/>

Career 
Before his Ph.D., Williams worked at the United States Naval Research Laboratory and NASA’s Goddard Space Flight Center. He most recently worked as a medical physicist in the Radiation Oncology
Department at the Brigham and Women's Hospital and Dana-Farber Cancer
Institute in Boston. He was the lead physicist for the Institute’s
MRI-guided adaptive radiation therapy program. His research focused on
developing image guidance techniques for cancer treatments.

Astronaut candidacy
On December 6, 2021, Williams was selected to join NASA's 23rd astronaut
candidate class.

References

Astronaut candidates
Massachusetts Institute of Technology alumni
Harvard Medical School alumni

Stanford University alumni

Living people

1983 births
People from Potomac, Maryland